William Thacher (1866–1953) was an American tennis player. He was born in New Haven, Connecticut. Thacher was a champion at Yale and semi finalist in the 1886 National Intercollegiate singles. Thacher was very well travelled and played several sports recreationally. Thacher also took an active part in his local church. While headmaster at the Thacher school (started by his brother) in Ojai, California, William built new tennis courts at the school and helped the game to thrive.

On his sole appearance in the U. S. Championships in 1887, Thacher beat Godfrey Brinley before losing to Howard Taylor in the semifinals.

References

1866 births
1953 deaths
19th-century male tennis players
American male tennis players
Tennis people from Connecticut